Jaimin Rajani (born on 30 June 1991 in Bombay) is a singer-songwriter and documentary filmmaker from Calcutta, India. He writes songs into the traditions of folk and rock music. As a producer, Jaimin has worked on the albums ‘Then & Now’ (2020) by Susmit Bose and ‘White Knight's Tale’ (2019) by High.

Discography

Albums
Cutting Loose (2022)

Cutting Loose (2022) 

His debut album, ‘Cutting Loose’ comprises fourteen songs about conflicts, disappointment and departure. The album features an ensemble of Indian musicians, such as Arka Chakraborty (pianist), Subharaj Ghosh (guitarist), Arjun Chakraborty (drummer), Ralph Pais (bassist), Deepak Castelino, Rahul Ram (of  Indian Ocean), and American bluegrass artistes Patrick Fitzsimons and Billy Cardine (of The Biscuit Burners).

In The Quint, filmmaker Jaideep Varma describes 'Cutting Loose' as "India's finest-ever album of original English songs". It was titled 'The Best Rock Album of the Year' at Clef Music Awards 2022. In addition to being critically acclaimed, the album and its individual tracks have been highly praised by illustrious artists like John Sebastian, Scarlet Rivera and Rob Stoner.

Track listing

Singles
"Bucket of Pain" (2022)
"She" (2022)
"I'm Going Solo" (2022)
"One More Night" (2022)
"She's Running Late" (2022)

Filmography

If Not for You (2019) 
In 2019, Jaimin made a documentary titled If Not for You

 narrated by veteran actor Dhritiman Chatterjee, on how American musician, Bob Dylan inspired notable Indian artists such as Anjan Dutt, Purna Das Baul, Amyt Datta, Usha Uthup, Susmit Bose, Arko Mukhaerjee, Miti Adhikari (of BBC Maida Vale Studios), Nondon Bagchi, Rahul Guha Ro (of Cassini's Division).

Calcutta Refurbished (2020) 
His series of short documentaries on subjects of great cultural and historical significance such as the Indian classical instrument shop Hemen & Co. and the Manackjee Rustomjee Parsi Dharamshala in Kolkata, featuring music by Ustad Aashish Khan, John Barham and Shiraz Ali Khan.

References

External links
 
 
 
 
 
 
 
 
 

Indian singer-songwriters
English-language singers from India
1991 births
Musicians from Kolkata
Indian guitarists
Indian documentary filmmakers
Living people
Gujaratis from Mumbai
Musicians from Mumbai
People from Mumbai
Indian male composers
Indian rock musicians
People from Kolkata
People from West Bengal
21st-century Indian musicians
Indian male folk singers
Writers about music
21st-century Indian composers
21st-century male musicians
21st-century guitarists